British Asia Airways Limited was a subsidiary of British Airways formed on 20 January 1993, based in Taiwan, to operate between London and Taipei via Hong Kong.

History
Due to political sensitivities, national airlines operating flights to the People's Republic of China were not permitted to fly to Taiwan. Similar arrangements were made by other airlines, such as Japan Airlines and Qantas.

It used the Boeing 747-400 repainted in a special livery, with the Union Flag tailfin being replaced by the Chinese characters 英亞 (Hanyu Pinyin: Yīng Yà; literally "British Asia").

It flew between Taipei and Hong Kong using the code BR, which BA had inherited from British Caledonian, while the flight from London used BA.

The airline ceased operations after BA suspended flights to Taipei in December 2001.

Destinations

Fleet

British Asia Airways operated the following aircraft:

See also
Airlines created for political reasons:
Australia Asia Airlines
Japan Asia Airways
KLM Asia
Swissair Asia
Air France Asie
Air Sinai

References

British Airways
Defunct airlines of Taiwan
Defunct airlines of the United Kingdom
Airlines established in 1993
Airlines disestablished in 2001
Former Oneworld affiliate members
1993 establishments in Taiwan
1993 establishments in the United Kingdom
2001 disestablishments in Taiwan
2001 disestablishments in the United Kingdom
Taiwanese companies established in 1993